Nicholaus Edward Goossen (born August 18, 1978) is a director, and a photographer.

Life and career
Goossen's first feature film was Grandma's Boy for Happy Madison Productions and 20th Century Fox. He collaborated with Adam Sandler (executive producer of Grandma's Boy) on the album Shhh...Don't Tell as a writer and co-producer in addition to performing on the track "Gay Robot".

Goossen directed the music video for the album's first single "Secret". It features Adam Sandler and comedian Nick Swardson (co-writer and star of Grandma's Boy) singing about the benefits of having trimmed pubic hair.

Goossen's previous credits include the short film A Day With the Meatball, which once again featured Sandler but focused primarily on his bulldog Meatball. The two-minute piece showcases the dog meandering around various places until he ends up back in his master's arms. It was shown in theaters around the United States in 2002 as an attachment to Sandler's animated film Eight Crazy Nights.

Goossen helped create Sandler's official website and directed several short films for the site.

In 2009, Goossen directed the horror film, The Shortcut in Saskatchewan, Canada. The film tells the story of two brothers who learn first hand about an urban legend surrounding a shortcut near their school.

In 2010, Goossen was the director of a Times Square interactive billboard installation for retailer Forever 21 which was developed by space150; the installation received media coverage for being "a clever, fresh project," but later, coverage focused on its similarities to Chris O'Shea's 2009 project in Liverpool.

In 2014 Goossen directed the video to the song "Human Sadness" by the American rock band Julian Casablancas + The Voidz.

In 2015 he directed the comedy specials Trevor Moore: High in Church and Nick Swardson: Taste It.

References

External links
Official Nicholaus Goossen Website

1978 births
American music video directors
Comedy film directors
Living people
People from Tarzana, Los Angeles
Film directors from Los Angeles